Philipsen is a surname. Notable people with the surname include: 

Andy Philipsen (1939–1985), Canadian politician
Constantin Philipsen (1859-1925), Danish photographer and cineaste
Gerry Philipsen (born 1944), American ethnographer of communication
Jasper Philipsen (born 1998), Belgian cyclist
Jette Philipsen, Danish cricketer 
Nicolai Philipsen (1880–1949), Danish gymnast
Preben Philipsen (1910–2005), Danish film producer, son of Constantin
Theodor Philipsen (1840-1920), Danish painter